Ella Island, or Ella Ø, is an island in eastern Greenland, within Northeast Greenland National Park.

Geography
Ella Island is located at the mouth of Kempe Fjord in the northern end of King Oscar Fjord. To the east lie larger Traill Island and Geographical Society Island. Off its northern end lie Maria Island and Ruth Island.

The island has an area of 143.6 km2 and a shoreline of 59.6 kilometres. Ella Island is separated from the western shore of the fjord by the Narwhal Sound.

History
Lauge Koch had a cabin on the northern side of the island named Eagle's nest. The botanist Thorvald Sørensen spent the years 1931-1935 here. His observations formed the basis for his doctoral thesis in 1941.

During World War II, US forces had an installation on the island called Bluie East Four. The Sirius Sledge Patrol maintains a small base on the island which is staffed only in summer.

In 1971 a meteorite was found on Ella Island, classified as a L-6 chondrite.

See also
List of islands of Greenland

References

Weblinks 
 Photograph of Sirius summer station
 Map of Ella Island showing location of station

Uninhabited islands of Greenland